The Plaza Grau is a public square located in the center of Lima, Peru. It is located at the intersection of the Paseo de la República with the Paseo Colón,  and the Paseo de los Héroes Navales. It was named in honor of Miguel Grau Seminario, commander of the Huáscar monitor during the War of the Pacific.

Description
The square has a rectangular shape with rounded vertices, bordered by gardens. In the center the Monumento a Miguel Grau Seminario monument stands, made of granite and bronze, the work of the Spanish sculptor Victorio Macho. It reaches a height of twenty-one meters.

The body of the monument is a four-sided granitic monolith, with vertical stretch marks and stands of ascending rhythms, which, according to the author, symbolizes the land of Peru. The stands that are seen at their base symbolize the sea. High height of the main face or front, is the sculpture of the hero represented with his sailor uniform and with his arms crossed, between a helm and the anchors of a ship. Under it, on the pedestal, a dedication reads: "To the glory of the great admiral of Peru Miguel Grau, the Millennium Peruvian." On the side faces are symbolic sculptures about stands, representing men who reach the heights with difficulty. In the posterior face there is a commemorative plaque of the battle of Angamos. And finally, the work is crowned by the allegory of fame, which raises its arms towards the sky in clamor of immortality, and that is driven in a mythical ship by tritones and sirens.

History

The original plaza dedicated to Grau was built in Callao in 1890, but was renamed Plaza Emilio San Martín, after Emilio San Martín, who died during the War of the Pacific. Before the memorials to Grau and San Martín, the plaza was originally known as Constitution Square and Victory Square.

The square was inaugurated on October 28, 1946, during the government of President José Luis Bustamante y Rivero. Towards the side of the Paseo Colón, a tribune was enabled for the guests (officials, diplomats, etc.), which were received by a special commission, chaired by the Captain Arturo Jiménez Pacheco.

The scenario featured members of the Armed Forces, Civil Guard and Battalions representating schools of Lima and Callao. The line was in command of Marshal Eloy Ureta, accompanied by its General Staff: General Manuel A. Odría, Luis Solari, Juan de Dios Párcos and Manuel Forero.

The ceremony began with a minute of silence in memory of the hero of Angamos, followed by an air exhibition. After the exhibition, President Bustamante and Rivero, accompanied by the mayor of Lima and veterans of the War of the Pacific, went to the foot of the monument. Frigate Manuel Elías Bonnemaison, the last survivor of the Huáscar crew, was responsible for decorting the veil that covered the sculpture. Before Grau's effigy, President Bustamante read in a speech that culminated as follows:

See also
Paseo de los Héroes Navales
Plaza Mayor de Lima
Plaza San Martín
Plaza Bolognesi

References

Squares in Lima
1946 in Peru
War of the Pacific